Deep Dark Canyon is a 2012 American independent dramatic thriller film by husband and wife writer/director team Abe Levy and Silver Tree.  The film stars Ted Levine, Nick Eversman and Spencer Treat Clark.  The film was originally called Lawless and was shot on location in the rural town of Guerneville, California.

Synopsis
Nate (Spencer Treat Clark) and Skylar (Nick Eversman), sons of sheriff Bloom Towne (Ted Levine), are involved in the accidental death of Mayor Cavanaugh's son Dick in a hunting accident. Older brother Nate fired the deadly shot, but to protect him, younger Skylar, still a minor, takes the blame.  Owning most of the town's businesses, the Cavanaugh family itself is wealthy and influential.  In retaliation, the family uses their influence to have Skylar set to be tried as an adult, rather than as a minor.  Desperate and filled with guilt, Nate breaks Skylar out of the county lock-up and, handcuffed together, the two escape into the local woods. Two deputies are killed in the escape and the Cavanaugh clan, deciding that the sheriff will be unable to act impartially, organize themselves into a search team with orders to shoot on sight.  Sheriff Towne joins the search efforts in order to reach his sons before they are shot by others. He is forced to measure the major political debt he owes to the Mayor and the Cavanaugh family, against his oath to uphold the law and the love he has for his two sons.

Cast
 Ted Levine as Sheriff Bloom Towne
 Spencer Treat Clark as Nate Towne
 Nick Eversman as Skylar Towne
 Martin Starr as Lloyd Cavanaugh
 Michael Bowen as Randy Cavanaugh
 Matthew Lillard as Jack Cavanaugh
 Justine Bateman as Cheryl Cavanaugh
 Greg Cipes as Guthrie Cavanaugh
 Abraham Benrubi as Michael Spencer
 Nicolas Christenson as Tony Cavanaugh
 Brandon Barrera as Eric Cavanaugh
 Micha Borodaev as Larry Cavanaugh
 Amaryllis Borrego as Roberta

Production
Originally titled Lawless, the project was shot in Sonoma County, California,  primarily in locations in Guerneville and along the Russian River.  The film was renamed to avoid confusions with other films of the same title and to better reflect " the atmospheric, rural setting in which it takes place, namely Guerneville".

Reception
Film Threat gave an overall positive review for the film, stating that all of the actors "turn in solid performances that keep the movie grounded in reality". The Village Voice gave a mixed review, criticizing that the film "depletes itself with inter-location crosscutting" but that "Levine commands every scene he's in with great support from a subtle and soulful Martin Starr as his conflicted deputy".

References

External links
 Deep Dark Canyon at the Internet Movie Database
 

2012 films
2010s crime drama films
2012 crime thriller films
American buddy films
American crime drama films
American crime thriller films
American independent films
American chase films
2012 drama films
2012 independent films
2010s English-language films
Films directed by Abe Levy
2010s American films